Sir Michael William Bunbury, 13th Baronet  (born 29 December 1946) is a British businessman. He is Chairman of HarbourVest Global Private Equity.

Business life

Duchy of Lancaster (became a member 1993; retired as chairman and member of council on 31 December 2005)
Board of Foreign and Colonial Investment Trust (in March 1998), chairman of the Private Equity Committee and represents the company's interests on the advisory committee of its Private Equity Managers
Chairman of JP Morgan Fleming Claverhouse Investment Trust Plc
Patron of Holy Innocents Church, Great Barton, Suffolk
Lloyd's of London: chairman of the PSL (Personal Stop Loss) Policyholders' Association
He was appointed a Knight Commander of the Royal Victorian Order (KCVO) in the 2005 Birthday Honours
Was High Sheriff of Suffolk in 2006.
 Deputy Lieutenant of Suffolk

Personal life

Educated Eton College and Trinity College, Cambridge. Married with two sons and a daughter, he lives at Naunton Hall, Rendlesham, Woodbridge, Suffolk.

References

Sources
Who's Who
Burke's Peerage

1946 births
Living people
People educated at Eton College
Alumni of Trinity College, Cambridge
Bunbury, Michael William, 13th Baronet
Michael
Deputy Lieutenants of Suffolk
Knights Commander of the Royal Victorian Order
High Sheriffs of Suffolk